A Fistful of Peril is the third studio album by American hip hop trio Czarface, which consists of rapper and Wu-Tang Clan member Inspectah Deck and underground hip hop duo 7L & Esoteric. It was released on October 25, 2016 via Silver Age. The album features guest appearances from Blacastan, Conway The Machine, Jesus Chrysler, Meyhem Lauren, Psycho Les and Rast RFC.

Track listing
All tracks produced by The Czar-Keys & Esoteric

Personnel
Seamus Ryan – main artist, performer, co-producer, executive producer
Jason Richard Hunter – main artist, performer, executive producer
George Andrinopoulos – main artist, producer, executive producer
Lester Fernandez – featured artist (track 4)
Demond Price – featured artist (track 6)
Ira Osu – featured artist (track 8)
James Rencher – featured artist (track 10)
Rast RFC – featured artists (track 10)
Jesus Chrysler – additional vocals (track 9)
Jeremy Page – guitar, bass & keyboards (tracks: 3, 6, 9, 11)
Todd Spadafore – producer
Joseph Caserta – mixing
Wes Garland – mastering
Alfredo Rico-Dimas – design & layout
Benjamin Marra – artwork

Charts

References

External links

2016 albums
Czarface albums
7L & Esoteric albums
Inspectah Deck albums
Collaborative albums